Free Inside may refer to:

 "Free Inside", song by Joe Brown, lyrics Ian La Frenais, Lem Lubin 1979 from the film Porridge	
 Ferry Corsten
 "Free Inside!", an episode of Cow and Chicken